Much is a municipality in the Rhein-Sieg district, in North Rhine-Westphalia, Germany.

Twin towns
  Doullens, France, since 1976
  Groß Köris, Brandenburg, since 1991

References

External links